Navegantes (Seafarers) is a coastal and tourist city located in Santa Catarina state, southern Brazil. The population is 83,626 (2020 est.) in an area of 112.0 km².

Ministro Victor Konder International Airport serves the popular beach resort of Balneário Camboriú, and other cities including Itajaí and Blumenau.

Economy: The main activity is fishing industry and ship building.  A private port was built in 2007, served by 4 berths (approx. 900m straight) and focused on refrigerated container cargo, due to Santa Catarina State have the biggest meat industry in Brazil.  As of 2012, there were 6 cranes, and plans for expansion of the quay.

References

Populated coastal places in Santa Catarina (state)
Municipalities in Santa Catarina (state)